Monument Creek is an El Paso County, Colorado, stream on the Arkansas River water basin. It flows south from Mount Deception through Pikeview and Monument, and into Colorado Springs, where it meets up with Fountain Creek.

Monument Creek watershed
The Monument Creek watershed is bounded on the north by the Palmer Divide, which divides the Platte River and Arkansas River watersheds. It extends from Black Forest west to Rampart Range.

Monument Valley Park

The creek runs through the center of the park from West Monroe south to West Bijou. The narrow Mesa Creek intersects with Monument Creek at the northwestern edge of the park.

Flood of 1935
A significant flood of Monument Creek occurred on Memorial Day, 1935 when it overflowed from constant heavy rains over May 30 and 31. Within the Monument Valley Park, three bridges were lost, the swimming pool filled with mud, trees were uprooted, and meadows and walkways were covered with silt and debris. Shadow Lake was made into a puddle. The streets were filled with water. The 3 natural springs were capped over with silt and debris as a result of the flood. Lakes in the park were washed away and pavilions were destroyed.  As a result, the park today looks very different than it did before the flood.

The Works Progress Administration (WPA) was engaged to renovate the park as the result of the flood damage. They built creekside stone retaining walls, bridges, rock steps and benches using timber and native stone as part of a rustic, picturesque design. A grandstand was built for one of the baseball fields. Stone markers were established with bronze plaques in recognition of the renovation work performed by the WPA. Features that were not replaced include a lake, some of the gardens, and rustic bridges.

Water quality mitigation
In 2004 and 2006 the creek was declared "impaired" for fish and wildlife due to the presence of selenium from an unknown source. In 2004 it was also said to have been subject to an unknown biologic stressor. Sufficient water quality was attained by May 6, 2008.

See also
List of rivers of Colorado

References

Rivers of Colorado
Rivers of El Paso County, Colorado
Geography of Colorado Springs, Colorado
Tributaries of the Arkansas River